Rising Fawn Gathering is an album by Americana and folk musicians Norman Blake, Nancy Blake, Jim and Rachel Bryan and the Celtic music group Boys of the Lough, released in 2009.

Track listing 
All songs traditional unless otherwise noted.
"Shacktown Road" – 4:34
"The Sweet Sunny South" (W. L. Bloomfield) – 5:54  
"O'Connell's Trip to Parliament/The Twin Katies" – 2:51  
"Castleberry's March" (Norman Blake) – 3:11  
"Da Unst Bridal March" (Traditional) – 2:59  
"The Stockton & Redesdale Hornpipes" – 3:29  
"The El Paso Waltz" (Dave Richardson) – 2:57  
"The Bonny Bunch of Roses" – 5:56  
"Joe Bane's/The Gypsy Princess" – 4:07  
"The Teelin March" – 3:46  
"Eamon an Chnoic (Ned of the Hill)" – 3:02  
"When the Band Is Playing Dixie" – 4:59  
"Derry So Fair" – 6:02

Personnel
Norman Blake – guitar, mandolin, dobro
Nancy Blake – guitar, mandolin, cello, mandola
Malcolm Stitt – guitar
James Bryan – fiddle
Brendan Begley – accordion
Cathal McConnell – flute, whistle
Dave Richardson – concertina, mandolin
Production notes:
Norman Blake – producer
Nancy Blake – producer
Scott O'Malley – executive producer, design
Butch Hause – engineer, mixing
David Glasser – mastering
Victoria Ward – design
Kathleen Fox Collins – design

External links
 Agency website
 Official website

References

2009 albums
Norman Blake (American musician) albums